Centola (Cilentan: Cendula) is a town and comune in the province of Salerno in the Campania region of south-western Italy.

Geography
Located in southern Cilento, Centola borders with the municipalities of Camerota, Celle di Bulgheria, Montano Antilia, Pisciotta and San Mauro la Bruca.

The municipality counts the town itself (2,550 inhabitants) and four hamlets (frazioni). Their population is listed under brackets.

Palinuro (1,202 inhabitants): the largest frazione, located by the sea
Foria (516 inhabitants). Located not too far from Centola
San Severino (435 inhabitants): it is home to medieval ruins, located by "Centola" railway station
San Nicola (370 inhabitants), the littlest hamlet of the comune

See also
Cilento
Cape Palinuro
Cilentan Coast

References

External links
 

Cities and towns in Campania
Localities of Cilento